Trimetrexate is a quinazoline derivative. It is a dihydrofolate reductase inhibitor.

Uses
It has been used with leucovorin in treating pneumocystis pneumonia.

It has been investigated for use in treating leiomyosarcoma.
It is a methotrexate (MTX) analog that is active against transport-deficient MTX-resistant tumor cells that overcome the acquired and natural resistance to methotrexate.  Other uses include skin lymphoma.

References

External links
 
 

Antifungals
Mammalian dihydrofolate reductase inhibitors
Protozoal dihydrofolate reductase inhibitors
Fungal dihydrofolate reductase inhibitors
Quinazolines
Antiprotozoal agents
Aromatic amines
Phenol ethers
Anilines